Hanna Skydan (born 14 May 1992 in Krasnyi Luch, Ukraine) is a Ukrainian-Azerbaijani hammer thrower. She competed for her country of birth at the 2012 Summer Olympics, and for Azerbaijan at the 2020 Summer Olympics, in Women's hammer throw.

Career 
For Azerbaijan she won the gold medals at the 2015 Summer Universiade and 2017 Islamic Solidarity Games.

Her personal best in the event is 75.29 metres set in Baku in 2017.

Competition record

References

1992 births
Living people
People from Krasnyi Luch
Ukrainian female hammer throwers
Azerbaijani female hammer throwers
Olympic athletes of Ukraine
Olympic athletes of Azerbaijan
Athletes (track and field) at the 2012 Summer Olympics
Athletes (track and field) at the 2016 Summer Olympics
World Athletics Championships athletes for Azerbaijan
European Athletics Championships medalists
Universiade medalists in athletics (track and field)
Ukrainian emigrants to Azerbaijan
Naturalized citizens of Azerbaijan
Universiade gold medalists for Azerbaijan
European Games competitors for Azerbaijan
Athletes (track and field) at the 2015 European Games
Medalists at the 2015 Summer Universiade
Competitors at the 2017 Summer Universiade
Islamic Solidarity Games competitors for Azerbaijan
Athletes (track and field) at the 2020 Summer Olympics
Sportspeople from Luhansk Oblast
Islamic Solidarity Games medalists in athletics